The Progressive Conservative Party of Ontario fielded a full slate of 103 candidates in the 2003 Ontario general election. The party, which had been in power since 1995, won twenty-four seats to become the official opposition in the sitting of the legislature that followed.

Candidates

Candidates in by-elections held between 2003 and 2007

Source for election results: Election Results, Elections Ontario, accessed 2 November 2021.

References

2003